Colonial Marines may refer to:

Military

 American colonial marines, Patriot naval infantry consisting of militiamen which served in various units during the American Revolutionary War
 Continental Marines, the naval infantry corps of the Continental Navy during the American Revolutionary War
 Corps of Colonial Marines, two British military units made up of freed American slaves which fought during the War of 1812
 Troupes de marine, a corps of the French Army intended for amphibious and overseas operations

Fiction
 Colonial Marine Corps (Battlestar Galactica), a fictional military organization in the Battlestar Galactica fictional universe

Alien franchise
Alien (Xenomorph/Space-Jockey) fictional universe
 United States Colonial Marines (Aliens), a fictional military organization
 Aliens: Colonial Marines Technical Manual, a 1995 guide to the fictional United States Colonial Marines depicted in the 1986 film Aliens
 Aliens: Colonial Marines (cancelled video game), a cancelled 2002 PlayStation 2 video game by Fox Interactive and Electronic Arts
 Aliens: Colonial Marines, a 2013 video game developed by Gearbox Software

See also

 Colonial (disambiguation)
 Marine (disambiguation)